Mohammad Daoud may refer to:
 Mohammed Daoud Khan (1909–1978), first president of Afghanistan, from 1973, until his assassination in 1978
 Mohammad Daoud (governor), former governor of Helmand Province, Afghanistan
 Mohammad Al-Abbasi (Mohammad Daoud, 1914–1972), Jordanian military figure and prime minister
 Abu Daoud (c. 1936–2010), one of the leaders the Black September movement
 Mohammad Daoud, minister of Culture (Lebanon), 2019–2020